Dicentria centralis is a moth of the family Notodontidae. It is found from Mexico south to Brazil.

References

Moths described in 1855
Notodontidae